Joy Schwikert (born May 19, 1954) is an American former professional tennis player.

Raised in Las Vegas, Schwikert began competing professionally in 1972 and often toured alongside twin sister Jill, with whom she reached the doubles quarter-finals of the 1974 Australian Open.

Schwikert's eldest daughter, Tasha, was an Olympic gymnast.

References

External links
 

1954 births
Living people
American female tennis players
Twin sportspeople
American twins
Tennis people from Nevada
Sportspeople from Las Vegas